Barbour's worm lizard (Amphisbaena anomala) is a worm lizard species in the family Amphisbaenidae. It is endemic to Brazil.

References

Amphisbaena (lizard)
Reptiles described in 1914
Taxa named by Thomas Barbour
Endemic fauna of Brazil
Reptiles of Brazil